Hemirrhagus is a genus of Mexican tarantulas that was first described by Eugène Louis Simon in 1903. It is considered a senior synonym of Spelopelma. Species of the genus Hemirrhagus are 5 to 12 cm long, usually black in colour, the urticating hairs on the opisthosoma are arranged in one dorsomedian patch, two dorsal paramedian patches, or two lateral patches. It is unique amongst the theraphosine genera because of the retrolateral coxal heels, the shape of the male palpal bulb, and the urticating hairs on the abdomen are reduced or completely missing. It is the only genus with epigean, troglophile and troglobitic species.

Distribution 
Hemirrhagus tarantulas are all found in Mexico all of them are largely distributed from Tamaulipas in the north to Chiapas in the south, primarily in the mountainous regions of Sierra Madre Oriental, Eje Volcánico Transversal, Sierra Norte de Oaxaca, and Sierra Madre Sur.  All of this tarantulas are found in individual caves, some species living in the same cave. The species are found in cave systems between 100m to 1900m above sea level. Most of them are found in central Mexico and the northern part of south Mexico.

Species

  it contains twenty-seven species, all found in Mexico:
 Hemirrhagus akheronteus Mendoza & Francke, 2018 – Mexico
 Hemirrhagus benzaa Mendoza, 2014 – Mexico
 Hemirrhagus billsteelei Mendoza & Francke, 2018 – Mexico
 Hemirrhagus cervinus (Simon, 1891) (type) – Mexico
 Hemirrhagus chilango Pérez-Miles & Locht, 2003 – Mexico
 Hemirrhagus coztic Pérez-Miles & Locht, 2003 – Mexico
 Hemirrhagus diablo Mendoza & Francke, 2018 – Mexico
 Hemirrhagus elliotti (Gertsch, 1973) – Mexico
 Hemirrhagus embolulatus Mendoza, 2014 – Mexico
 Hemirrhagus eros Pérez-Miles & Locht, 2003 – Mexico
 Hemirrhagus franckei Mendoza, 2014 – Mexico
 Hemirrhagus gertschi Pérez-Miles & Locht, 2003 – Mexico
 Hemirrhagus grieta (Gertsch, 1982) – Mexico
 Hemirrhagus guichi Mendoza, 2014 – Mexico
 Hemirrhagus kalebi Mendoza & Francke, 2018 – Mexico
 Hemirrhagus lochti Estrada-Alvarez, 2014 – Mexico
 Hemirrhagus mitchelli (Gertsch, 1982) – Mexico
 Hemirrhagus nahuanus (Gertsch, 1982) – Mexico
 Hemirrhagus ocellatus Pérez-Miles & Locht, 2003 – Mexico
 Hemirrhagus papalotl Pérez-Miles & Locht, 2003 – Mexico
 Hemirrhagus perezmilesi García-Villafuerte & Locht, 2010 – Mexico
 Hemirrhagus pernix (Ausserer, 1875) – Mexico
 Hemirrhagus puebla (Gertsch, 1982) – Mexico
 Hemirrhagus reddelli (Gertsch, 1973) – Mexico
 Hemirrhagus sprousei Mendoza & Francke, 2018 – Mexico
 Hemirrhagus stygius (Gertsch, 1971) – Mexico
 Hemirrhagus valdezi Mendoza, 2014 – Mexico

See also
 List of Theraphosidae species

References

Theraphosidae genera
Endemic spiders of Mexico
Theraphosidae